Lullaby (translit. Kolybelnaya) is a 1937 Soviet documentary film directed by Dziga Vertov. The film was shot to commemorate the 20th anniversary of October Revolution.

External links

1937 documentary films
1937 films
Soviet documentary films
1930s Russian-language films
Soviet black-and-white films
Films directed by Dziga Vertov
Russian Revolution films
Black-and-white documentary films
Soviet revolutionary propaganda films